Open Design Alliance is a nonprofit organization creating software development kits (SDKs) for engineering applications. ODA offers interoperability tools for CAD, BIM, and Mechanical industries including .dwg, .dxf, .dgn, Autodesk Revit, Autodesk Navisworks, and .ifc files and additional tools for visualization, web development, 3D PDF publishing and modeling.

ODA products and supported file formats

CAD
 Drawings SDK is a development toolkit that provides access to all data in .dwg and .dgn through an object-oriented API, allows creating and editing any type of .dwg or .dgn drawing file, and can be extended with custom .dwg objects. (Old names: Teigha Drawings, Teigha for .dwg files and Teigha for .dgn files; OpenDWG and DWGdirect; DGNdirect.)

Drawings SDK also provides exchange of the following file formats to and from .dwg and .dgn:

 Architecture SDK is a development toolkit for building .dwg-based architectural design applications. It offers interoperability with Autodesk Architecture files (old name: Teigha Architecture).
 Civil SDK is a development toolkit for working with Autodesk Civil 3D files. The Civil API provides read/write access to data in civil custom objects (old name: Teigha Civil).
 Map SDK is a development toolkit for working with Autodesk® Map 3D custom objects in any ODA-based application.

BIM
 BimRv SDK is a development toolkit for reading, writing, and creating .rvt and .rfa files.
 IFC SDK is a development toolkit featuring 100% compatibility with the buildingSMART IFC standard. It offers a geometry building module for creating IFC geometry, which includes the ODA facet modeler and B-Rep modeler.
 BimNv is a development toolkit for reading, visualizing and creating Autodesk Navisworks files.
 Scan-To-BIM is a development toolkit for converting point cloud data to 3D BIM models.

Mechanical
 Mechanical SDK is a development toolkit for working with Autodesk Mechanical files.
 STEP SDK is one of the newest ODA development toolkits; it provides access to STEP model data. In production since October 2022.
 MCAD SDK is an open exchange platform for 3D MCAD file formats such as Inventor, IGES, Rhino, CATIA V4, CADDS, 3Shape DCM, CATIA V5, PLMXML, Parasolid, SolidWorks, Creo, STEP, SolidEdge, ProE, UG NX, CGR, CATIA V6, JT, and Procera.

ODA Core Platform Technologies
 Visualize SDK is a graphics toolkit designed for engineering applications development.
 Web SDK uses Visualize SDK to embed engineering models into web pages and create web/SaaS applications.
 Publish SDK is a development toolkit for creating 2D and 3D .pdf and .prc models. All PDFs are compatible with ISO standards and Adobe tools. Publish SDK can create PRC-based 3D PDF documents that contain full B-Rep models and can include animation, interactive views, part lists, etc.

History
 The Alliance was formed in February 1998 as the OpenDWG Alliance, with its initial release of code based on the AUTODIRECT libraries written by Matt Richards of MarComp.
 In 2002, the OpenDWG library was renamed to DWGdirect.
 And the same year, the alliance was renamed to Open Design Alliance.
 On 22 November 2006, Autodesk sued the Open Design Alliance alleging that its DWGdirect libraries infringed Autodesk's trademark for the word "Autodesk", by writing the TrustedDWG code (including the word "AutoCAD") into DWG files it created.  In April 2007, the suit was dropped, with Autodesk modifying the warning message in AutoCAD 2008 (to make it more benign), and the Open Design Alliance removing support for the TrustedDWG code from its DWGdirect libraries.
 In 2008, support was added for .dgn files with DGNdirect.
 In April 2010, DWGdirect was renamed to Teigha for .dwg files, OpenDWG was renamed to Teigha Classic and DGNdirect was renamed to Teigha for .dgn files.
 Since August 2017 (v. 4.3.1), Teigha contains production support for version 2018 .dwg files, including architectural, civil and mechanical custom objects.
 In February 2018 (v. 4.3.2), it was announced the availability of STL (stereolithography, is widely used for 3D printing and rapid prototyping) and OBJ (serves as an open exchange format for many 3D design solutions) file support.
 In September 2018 Teigha brand was removed.
 In October 2018 ODA started work on IFC Solution 
 In January 2019 Drawings 2019.2 introduced extrude and revolve 3d solid modeling operations as part of the standard SDK 
 In January 2019 ODA announced the release of its new BimNv SDK 
 In May 2020 ODA switched to monthly releases
 In June 2020 ODA released its free Open IFC Viewer
 In July 2021 ODA started development for STEP Support
 In October 2021 ODA released its IFC validation engine
 In January 2022 ODA started Scan-to-BIM development 
 In September 2022 ODA started MCAD SDK development 
 In October 2022 ODA released STEP SDK for production use

Membership
There are six types of ODA membership:
 Educational: qualified university use only, 1 year limit
 Non-commercial: any kind of internal automation for in-house use and R&D, 2 year limit
 Commercial: limited commercial use (sell up to 100 copies), web/SaaS use not allowed
 Sustaining: unlimited commercial use, web/SaaS use allowed
 Founding: unlimited commercial use with full source code
 Corporate: unlimited commercial use across multiple business units
There is also a free trial period.

Releases
Open Design Alliance provides monthly production releases.

Annual ODA conference
Open Design Alliance holds an ODA conference every year in September. The two-day conference includes presentations from directors and developers and face-to-face meetings for non-members, members, ODA developers, and ODA executives. Anyone who is interested can register and attend the conference.

Members of the ODA (not exhaustive)

Corporate members
 Alias Limited
 Allplan
 Autodesk
 AVEVA
 Bricsys
 Dassault Systemes
 Nemetschek
 Design Data Corporation
 Graphisoft
 Hexagon AB
 Intergraph
 IronCAD
 Knowledge Base
 Microsoft
 Nanosoft
 OpenText Corp
 Shenzhen Jiang & Associates Creative Design
 Spatial Corp
 Vianova Systems AS

Founding members
 4M SA
 Accusoft Corporation
 Advanced Computer Solutions
 Andor Corporation
 Beijing Glory PKPM Technology
 Bentley Systems
 BlueCielo ECM Solutions
 Software
 Central South University
 Chongqing Chinabyte Network Co Ltd
 CSoft Development
 EntIT Software LLC
 Epic Games
 Esri
 Glodon
 Graebert GmbH
 GRAITEC INNOVATION SAS
 Gstarsoft
 Haofang Tech
 Hilti
 Hyland
 IMSI/Design
 IntelliCAD
 Intrasec
 ITI TranscenData
 MIDAS Information Technology
 Onshape
 Oracle
 Photron
 Relativity
 Robert McNeel And Associates
 Safe Software
 Shandong Hoteam Software
 Shenzhen ZhiHuiRuiTu Information Technology
 Siemens
 Stabiplan
 Trimble
 UNIFI Labs
 Watchtower Bible and Tract Society
 ZwCAD Software

See also
 AutoCAD DWG
 Digital modeling and fabrication
 Open Cascade Technology
 Building Information Modeling
 Industry Foundation Classes

References

External links
 

Computer-aided engineering software
Information technology organizations
CAD file formats
Open formats